Tarman (also Romanized as Tarmān, Termān, and Tormān) is a village in Howmeh Rural District, in the Central District of Lamerd County, Fars Province, Iran. At the 2006 census, its population was 616, in 127 families.

References 

Populated places in Lamerd County